Stony Run may refer to:

Stony Run (Baltimore), a stream in Baltimore, Maryland
Stony Run (Buffalo Creek), a stream in Union County, Pennsylvania
Stony Run (Little Catawissa Creek), a stream in Columbia and Schuylkill Counties Pennsylvania
Stony Run (Minnesota), a stream in Big Stone County, Minnesota
Stony Run, Pennsylvania
Stony Run Township, Yellow Medicine County, Minnesota
Stony Run (Anderson Creek tributary), a stream in Clearfield County, Pennsylvania

See also
Stony Brook (disambiguation)
Stony Run Creek
Stony Creek (disambiguation)